The Derbiul Bucureștiului  (English: Bucharest derby), also known as Derbi de București and Big Bucharest derby is the football local derby in Bucharest, Romania , between Steaua Bucuresti(FCSB) and Rapid București . It is considered to be one of the fiercest intra-city derbies in the country, along with the other major local derbies, Cluj derby and Eternal derby , and one of the greatest and hotly contested derbies in Europe.

History
The two clubs have played each other over 130 times, beginning with Rapid's 1–0 victory on November 4, 1947 (at the time Rapid was named 'CFR'). Several matches throughout the years between CSA Steaua and Rapid have ended in serious clashes between fans.

The two teams are notable for their dominance of Romanian football, alongside Dinamo. Even though Rapid only won 3 Romanian football championships  (while FCSB is dominating with 26 titles won), they dominate the Romanian Cup (23 times for FCSB and 13 times for Rapid) and the Romanian Supercup (6 times for FCSB and 4 times for Rapid).

They also have great performances in club competitions organised by UEFA among other Romanian football team. CSA Steaua won the European Cup in 1986, was runner-up in the same competition in 1989 after reaching the semi-finals in 1988. In 2006, CSA Steaua reached the semi-finals of the UEFA Cup, by dramatically eliminating Rapid in the quarter-finals. Moreover, CSA Steaua won the UEFA Super Cup in 1986 and was defeated in the Intercontinental Cup by River Plate the same year. On the other hand, Rapid won the Balkans Cup 2 times in a row in 1964 and 1966 and reached the quarter-finals of the UEFA Cup Winners' Cup in 1973. Rapid also reached the quarter-finals of the UEFA Cup in 2006, being outpassed by FCSB. The conflict between the fans has become even fiercer since then.

With Dinamo Bucharest's relegation in 2022, the game between FCSB and Rapid quickly attracted the largest audience in modern-day Liga 1.

The rivalry also extends to other sports.

Honours

Statistics and record

Records 
 Largest win: Rapid București 2–8 Steaua București  on 3 May 1989
 Largest home win (championship): Steaua București 5–0 Rapid București on 19 June 1988
 Largest away win (championship): Rapid București 2–8 Steaua București on 3 May 1989
 The most goals in one match (all competitions): 10 in Rapid București 2–8 Steaua București on 3 May 1989, Divizia A
 The most goals in one match (championship): 10 in Rapid București 2–8 Steaua București on 3 May 1989
 Steaua's largest win: Rapid București 2–8 Steaua București on 3 May 1989
 Steaua's longest series undefeated (all competitions): 23 matches (18 wins, 5 draws) between 22 May 1977 and 19 March 1994
 Steaua's longest series undefeated (championship): 20 matches (16 wins, 4 draws) between 22 May 1977 and 19 March 1994
Rapid Bucharest's greatest win(championship): 5-1, 18 April 2010

Head to head results

All matches

Liga I

Romanian Cup (Cupa României)

Romanian SuperCup (Supercupa României)

League Cup (Cupa Ligii)

UEFA Cup

Managers who coached both teams
1 – still an active manager

See also

 Eternal derby (Romania)

References

Football rivalries in Romania
Football in Romania
Sports competitions in Bucharest
FC Rapid București
1947 establishments in Romania